Runanubandha - The HE without HIM is a 2018 Bengali language independent feature film written and directed by Amartya Bhattacharyya. The film premiered at the International competition section (Innovation in Moving Images) at the 24h Kolkata International Film Festival.

The film had its Russian Premiere at the prestigious 41st Moscow International Film Festival 2019. Amartya Bhattacharyya won the Best Editing award for Runanubandha at the Mosaic International South Asian Film Festival 2019 in Canada.

Cast 

 Priyanka Ghosh Roy as Satarupa
 Swastik Choudhury as Bhola
 Urbi Sengupta as Imaginary Satarupa
Tushar Ray as Thontkata Bidghut (Frankly Bitter)
 Susant Misra  as Mishra Ji

Film festival screenings

References 

Bengali-language Indian films
2010s Bengali-language films